Sergey Teslya is a Russian violinist, born in Novosibirsk.

A former member of Vladimir Spivakov's chamber orchestra Moscow Virtuosi, Teslya settled in Spain in 1990. He has held the concertmaster chair at the Real Orquesta Sinfónica de Sevilla (1994–2002) -for which he created a chamber orchestra- and the Orquesta Nacional de España (2002– ), and has performed as a soloist in several Spanish concert halls.

References 
 Orquesta Nacional de España
 Fundación Príncipe de Asturias
 Auditorio y Centro de congresos Víctor Villegas - Orquesta Sinfónica de la Región de Murcia 2008-09 season 7th concert's program
  Goldberg Magazine - Concert Agenda.
 Auditorio Nacional
 Mundoclasico.com concert review

Soviet classical violinists
20th-century classical violinists
Male classical violinists
Academic staff of the Reina Sofía School of Music
Year of birth missing (living people)
Living people
Musicians from Novosibirsk
Russian expatriates in Spain
21st-century classical violinists
20th-century Russian male musicians
21st-century Russian male musicians